Justus Gesenius (b. at Esbeck (near Elze), in the principality of Calenberg, 6 July 1601 - d. at Hanover 18 September 1673) was a Lutheran theologian of the seventeenth century, known for his catechisms.

His father was preacher at Esbeck. Having received his early education at the Adreanum in Hildesheim, he went in his eighteenth year to the University of Helmstedt, where he studied under Georg Calixtus and Conrad Horneius. In 1628 he took his degree of master of philosophy in Jena and was called as pastor to the church of St. Magnus in Brunswick. After seven years of beneficent activity there, he received a call to Hildesheim, the seat of George, duke of Brunswick and Lunenburg, as court chaplain and preacher in the Collegiate of St. Blaise. After the duke's death (1641), he, as well as the whole
consistory, removed to Hanover, where he became chief court chaplain and general superintendent of the principality of Calenberg. Later (1665) he was general superintendent of Grubenhagen as well. He received the degree of doctor of divinity in 1643 for a dissertation, De igne purgatorio.

Gesenius' importance lies chiefly in the services he rendered in the production of good hymnals and catechisms. With his friend David Denicke, he brought out a hymnal containing 222 hymns (Hanover, 1646), which was later enlarged and arranged for use in the churches. The compilers did not confine themselves to collecting and arranging the hymns, but also adapted many of the older ones and probably added a few of their own composition. To correct the prevailing ignorance in regard to Christian doctrine, Gesenius, in 1631, brought out his Kleine Katechismusschule, or " Brief Instruction as to how the Catechism Should be Taught to the Young and the Simple " (often reprinted). Later, by order of Duke George and of the consistory, he issued an abridgment of this work under the title Kleine Catechismusfragen über den kleinen Catechismum Lutheri (1639 and manytimes republished). This work constitutes the celebrated catechism of Gesenius, which was introduced into all the schools of the principality of Calenberg and gained great repute in many parts of Lower Saxony.

Notwithstanding the praise which was accorded the author, he was violently attacked, especially by Statius Buscher in his Cryptopapismus novae theologiae Helmstadiensis (Hamburg, 1638). Although Gesenius justified himself in a Grundliche Widerlegung (Lunenburg, 1641) and although his innocence was established through an investigation by impartial theologians, it must be admitted that, carried away by his zeal for a lively faith and for better knowledge, he allowed himself to wander from the straight path of Lutheran doctrine. Of the charge that he was secretly a Roman Catholic he clears himself in his last important work, Warum willst du nicht römisch-katholisch werden, wie deine Vorfahren waren? (4 parts, Hanover, 1669 72). The strife concerning his Catechismusfragen was renewed in the eighteenth century, when King George I, in 1723, sought vainly to introduce Gesenius' catechism into the duchies of Bremen and Verden (cf. Unschuldige Nachrichten, 1724). In addition to the other services rendered by Gesenius to the cause of religious education, he published, in 1656, a manual of instruction in Biblical history, Biblische Historien Alten and Neuen Testaments.

Sources

External links
Justus Gesenius (Hymn-Writer) - Bach Cantatas
Justus Gesenius 1601-1673 - The Cyber Hymnal

1601 births
1673 deaths
German Lutheran theologians
German Lutheran hymnwriters
University of Helmstedt alumni
17th-century German Protestant theologians
German male non-fiction writers
17th-century hymnwriters
17th-century German writers
17th-century German male writers